Highasakite is an indie pop and indie rock band from Norway. The band formed when vocalist and songwriter Ingrid Helene Håvik met drummer Trond Bersu whilst studying jazz at the Trondheim Jazz Conservatory. In 2010, after just six months, the duo started working on their debut album. The album All That Floats Will Rain was released in 2012.

History

Formation and All That Floats Will Rain (2010–2012) 
Vocalist Ingrid Håvik and drummer Trond Bersu met while Bersu was studying jazz at the Trondheim Jazz Conservatory; after starting out as a duo, the two recruited Thomas Dahl, a producer, to help out on bass and guitar, and Øystein Skar joined the group to play synthesizer. After bonding they spent the next six months working on a debut album. Their debut album, All That Floats Will Rain, was released in Norway in February 2012 on the record label Riot Factory, and was produced by Juhani Silvola and Thomas Dahl. The album reached #16 on the Norwegian Albums Chart. After the album's release the band began to play live shows, adding Marte Eberson on synthesizer and Kristoffer Lo on guitar, percussion, flugabone, and tuba to extend their layered instrumentation, and flesh out their sound. Highasakite started out opening for other musical projects like Your Headlights Are On, PELbO and Sacred Harp. The band later performed at many festivals in 2012, including Øyafestivalen and the Iceland Airwaves.

Silent Treatment (2014) 
Their second album, Silent Treatment, was released in February 2014 and reached #1 on the Norwegian Albums Chart. It was named the second best album of the year by Norwegian music critics in a list published by Dagsavisen. The group toured extensively this year, mostly in Norway. They also toured with the Icelandic band Of Monsters and Men during their Europe tour. At the 2015 14th Annual Independent Music Awards, Highasakite was the winner in the "Pop Album" category for Silent Treatment. The band had the first album with 92 consecutive weeks (and counting) on the Norwegian Billboard "Topp 40" at VG-lista. For the album, Highasakite won the "Pop Group of the Year Award" at the Norwegian equivalent of the Grammy Awards, Spellemannprisen; additionally Håvik was nominated in the categories "Composer of the Year" and "Writer of the Year", winning the former. The same year the band won the Bendiksen Award, an award and grant given to up-and-coming artists to help develop their talent, winning 100,000 Norwegian kroner.

Camp Echo (2016) 
The third album, Camp Echo, was released on 20 May 2016. The first single from the album, "Someone Who'll Get it", released early 2016, received significant critical acclaim upon release, highlighting an anticipation for their third album. The second single, "Golden Ticket", was released in April 2016. On 2 December 2016 the band released the Acoustic Versions EP, consisting of four previous tracks from Camp Echo and Silent Treatment. The EP features band member Marte Eberson on the piano, and shows off lead singer Ingrid Helene Håvik's arrangement ability and powerful vocals.

Highasakite was one of several performers, alongside artists including Sting and Halsey, who played at the Nobel Peace Prize Concert 2016 on 11 December, performing songs "Golden Ticket" and "Lover, Where Do You Live?".

Their album Camp Echo was shortlisted by IMPALA (The Independent Music Companies Association) for the Album of the Year Award 2016, which rewards on a yearly basis the best album released on an independent European label.

Highasakite released the single "5 Million Miles" in April 2017.

Uranium Heart and The Bare Romantic (2019–2020) 
On 16 November 2018, the band announced their fourth studio album Uranium Heart, produced by Bersu with all tracks written by Håvik. The album was later released on 1 February 2019, and the band embarked on an arena sized tour across Norway. 

In October 2019, the band released the first part of a two part mini album titled "The Bare Romantic", with first single "Can I Be Forgiven" reaching #26 on the Spotify Norway top 200. The second part of the mini album, released 7 February 2020 contained the single "Under The Sun" which received a sync in the Norwegian film Tunnelen. 

In February 2020 Highasakite were nominated for the "Pop Group of the Year Award" at the Norwegian equivalent of the Grammy Awards.

Discography

Albums

Extended plays

Singles

Awards and nominations

References

External links 

Spellemannprisen winners
Norwegian indie pop groups
Propeller Recordings artists
Musical groups established in 2011
2011 establishments in Norway